Thomas Allin (1757–1833) was a Kentucky politician.

Thomas Allin may also refer to:

 Thomas Allin (Methodist) (1784–1866), English Methodist
 Thomas Allin (Anglican) (1838–1909), English Episcopalian
 Sir Thomas Allin, 1st Baronet (1612–1685), British naval officer
 Thomas Allin (footballer) (1862–?), English footballer

See also
 Thomas Allen (disambiguation)